Maria Suelen Altheman (born 12 August 1988) is a Brazilian heavyweight judoka. She won silver medals at the world championships in 2013 and 2014 and bronze medals at the Pan American Games in 2011 and 2015.

She finished joint 5th at the 2012 Summer Olympics.  She beat Anne-Sophie Mondière in her first match, then Nihel Cheikh Rouhou before losing to Mika Sugimoto in the quarterfinals.  Because Sugimoto reached the final, Altheman was entered into the repechage.  In the repechage, she beat Gulzhan Issanova before losing her bronze medal match to Tong Wen.

She qualified for the 2016 Summer Olympics, where she lost in the first fight. At the 2020 Summer Olympics, Altman won her first fight only to injure her knee losing the quarterfinal to Romane Dicko, forcing her to abandon the tournament rather than go to the repechage.

References

External links

 
 

Judoka at the 2011 Pan American Games
Brazilian people of German descent
Living people
1988 births
Judoka at the 2012 Summer Olympics
Judoka at the 2016 Summer Olympics
Olympic judoka of Brazil
Sportspeople from São Paulo
Brazilian female judoka
Pan American Games bronze medalists for Brazil
Pan American Games medalists in judo
Judoka at the 2015 Pan American Games
Medalists at the 2015 Pan American Games
Judoka at the 2020 Summer Olympics
21st-century Brazilian women